Sport Club Internacional, commonly known as Internacional or simply Inter, is a Brazilian professional football club based in Porto Alegre. They play in the Série A, the first division of the Brazilian league, as well as in Campeonato Gaúcho Série A, the first level of the Rio Grande do Sul state football league. The team's home stadium, known as Estádio Beira-Rio ("Riverside"), was one of the twelve 2014 FIFA World Cup venues and has a capacity of 50,128.

The club was founded in 1909 by the Poppe brothers, with the clear goal of being a democratic institution without prejudice. Its colors are red and white and its fans are known as Colorados. It is one of the most successful clubs in Brazil and the Americas, being the third club with the most international titles in Brazil, with seven trophies. Its historical rival is Grêmio Foot-Ball Porto Alegrense, with whom it contests the Grenal, one of the greatest derbies of the world.

Internacional is part of a large membership-based sports club with more than 200,000 associates. 2006 was the most successful year in Inter's history as they won the Copa Libertadores and the FIFA Club World Cup for the first time, defeating European champions Barcelona in the latter and Club World Cup reigning champions São Paulo in the former. Inter once again won the continental title in 2010.

Other major honours include the 1975, 1976, and 1979 Brazilian league titles, the latter being the only time a club has won the title undefeated, the 2007 and the 2011 Recopa Sudamericana, the 1992 Copa do Brasil, and the 2008 Copa Sudamericana…

History

The crest
The first crest of Sport Club Internacional was designed with the initials SCI in red over a white background, without the red contour that appeared shortly afterward. In the Fifties, the colors were inverted, the initials written in white over a red background. After the club won the Copa Libertadores, the emblem gained another star which is 50% bigger and is placed above the other four, which represent the three Brazilian championships (1975, 1976 and 1979) and the Brazilian Cup title (1992). However, Inter won the FIFA Club World Cup that same year, and the star symbolizing the Copa Libertadores title was moved down between the four stars representing the club's national honors, and a new diamond star was placed above it to commemorate the world crown. After winning the Libertadores again in 2010, yet another star was added.

"Rolo Compressor": The Steamroller

The Forties were remarkable for the Colorados. One of the greatest squads in the club's history was formed in that decade, which earned the nickname Rolo Compressor, Portuguese for "Steamroller". They were an extremely offensive team that played from 1939 to 1948 and won eight Rio Grande do Sul championships. The reason for such superiority dated back to 1926, the year Inter started accepting black players in their squad – something that was not allowed by rivals Grêmio until 1952. That decision ended up strengthening the team, which placed no restrictions and always had the best players, and also gave birth to the affectionate nickname of "The People's Club."

That team included some of the greatest football players in the club's history. Alfeu, Tesourinha, Abigail, Carlitos, Adãozinho, among others. The term "Rolo Compressor" was coined to represent Inter's power of "crushing the opposition" in their quest for victories. It showed the superiority of the team at that time.

The club's growth
The end of the Forties marked the beginning of an era of growth for Internacional. The club restored the Eucaliptos, their old stadium, to host two matches of the FIFA World Cup in 1950 – Mexico vs Yugoslavia and Mexico vs Switzerland. On the pitch, Inter kept developing great players and provided most of the squad for the national team that won the 1956 Pan-American Games in Mexico.

The Brazilian Pan-American games squad played their first match on 1 March 1956, when they beat Chile 2–1. In the game against Costa Rica, up to then the greatest surprise of the competition, Brazil demolished the opposition by 7–1, with goals scored by Larry (3), Chinesinho (3) and Bodinho.

The final was played against Argentina. A 2–2 draw meant the title of the Pan-American Games Mexico 1956 for Teté's men on an unbeaten run. Back in Brazil, the players were visited in Rio de Janeiro by the Vice President of the Republic, João Goulart (a former juvenile player for the team), and went to the Catete Palace to receive the trophy from the hands of the President of the Republic, Juscelino Kubitschek.

In the Sixties, the Eucaliptos was becoming small for the large fan base. It was necessary to build a new stadium. Supporters mobilised and helped build Beira-Rio by donating bricks, iron bars, and cement. Ten years of work elapsed until the new Colorado home was inaugurated on 6 April 1969. The ground's magnitude was reflected in its name: Gigante da Beira-Rio (literally the "Giant on the River Banks" in Portuguese).

An era of titles

Perhaps no other time is remembered with more affection and longing by the Internacional supporters than the victorious Seventies. In that decade, Inter became the most successful club in Rio Grande do Sul and in Brazil. The new Beira-Rio stadium met the expectations of the fanatic crowd, and was the stage for some of the best years in Internacional's history. In 1975, after a thrilling victory against Cruzeiro at Beira-Rio, the Colorados secured the Brazilian championship title. The only goal of the match was scored by Chilean star defender Elías Figueroa, with the so-called illuminated goal. The first golden star was now on the chest of every Colorado.

In 1976, Internacional kept the victorious squad from the previous year and arrived at the top of Brazil's football for the second time. They won the title over Corinthians by winning the final match 2–0. Valdomiro was the man of the match and scored the decisive goal. The campaign in 1976 was remarkable: in 23 matches for the Brazilian Championship, Rubens Minelli's men won 19, drew one and lost just three.

The end of the decade was crowned with yet another great victory. Inter won their third Brazilian title in 1979 after beating Vasco da Gama 2–1. With 16 wins, the team did not suffer a single defeat during the championship, a deed yet unmatched by any other club in Brazil. With this victory a third star was added over the club's emblem.

The world meets Inter
In the 1980s Internacional enhanced its international stature. Led by legends such as Falcão, Edevaldo and Batista, Internacional reached the final of the Copa Libertadores in 1980 where they were grouped in Group 3 alongside compatriots Vasco da Gama and Venezuelan sides Deportivo Galicia and Deportivo Táchira. Internacional finished first in their group with four wins, one tie and one loss (although the defeat surprisingly came from Deportivo Galicia). In the semi-finals stage, the Colorados were grouped with Argentine side Vélez Sarsfield and Colombian powerhouse América de Cali; once again, Inter managed to top the group with two victories over Velez and two draws against America (which was enough to see them reach the final). In the finals, Internacional faced off against Nacional, who had already won the Copa Libertadores once in 1971. The Colorado couldn't break the Uruguayan backline and the first leg, played at the Beira-Rio, finished 0–0. At the Estadio Centenario in Montevideo, Inter were defeated 1–0. Despite losing Internacional's most important match ever, it set a precedent of great moments to come in this decade, as the team went on to win the Campeonato Gaúcho four years in a row starting in 1981.

Internacional found itself as the base for the national team again, in 1984. The last time this has happened was in 1956, when eight footballers out of the 22-player squad called up for the national team played for Internacional. To represent Brazil in 1984 in Los Angeles, Internacional had their whole squad called up. The eleven players, from the goalkeeper to the number 11, won the silver medal. The team became known as "Sele/Inter". After beating Italy and Germany, Brazil won the football silver medal, a deed repeated in 1988, when Inter players such as goalkeeper Taffarel, full-back Luis Carlos Wink and center-back Aloisio defended the Brazilian colors. That same group would help Internacional become runners-up in 1987 and 1988 in the Brazilian championship.

In 1987, Inter started off well after finishing the first phase in first place of their group with four wins, two ties, and two defeats. In the semi-finals, the squad overcame Cruzeiro after a 0–1 victory at the Mineirão. However, in the finals Inter lost the chance at a fourth title after being defeated by Flamengo, containing famous players as Zico, Bebeto, Jorginho, Leandro, Edinho, Leonardo, Andrade, Zinho and Renato Gaúcho (who was elected the best player in the tournament). Once again in 1988, Inter found itself in the semifinals, this time after finishing second in their group in the first phase. Inter faced a real battle against arch-rivals Grêmio. The semi-final of the Brazilian Championship meant not only a bye to the final match, but also a place in the Copa Libertadores. The encounter became known as the "Gre-Nal of the Century." With just ten players on the pitch, Inter ended the first half down 1–0. In the second half, pushed by a large crowd at Beira-Rio, the Colorados came from behind to defeat Grêmio with two goals scored by striker Nilson. In the final Inter fell to Bahia after losing 2–1 away on the first leg and failing to capitalize at home with a 0–0 tie.

In the 1989 Copa Libertadores, Internacional started poorly; they managed to progress to the Round of 16 but only after finishing third in their group, winning only two matches, drawing once and losing three. However, that would change in the knockout stages as Inter defeated five-times Libertadores winners Peñarol 1–2 in Montevideo and 6–2 in Porto Alegre. The quarter-finals saw the team face off against Brazilian champions Bahia in a rematch of the Brasileirao finals they disputed a few months earlier; this time, Internacional beat Bahia 1–0 at home and ground out a 0–0 draw to progress to the semi-finals and exact revenge on the tricolor de aço. The semifinals had Internacional face off against a tough opponent: Olimpia, who were the reigning champions of Paraguay. Olimpia, who were winners of the 1979 Copa Libertadores, were blossoming in their second golden era with players such as Ever Almeida, Gabriel González, Adriano Samaniego, and star Raúl Vicente Amarilla, all coached by legend Luis Cubilla. The first match took place in Asunción; Inter managed to win 0–1 and were full of confidence in the return leg back home. However, Olimpia managed a spirited comeback and won the return leg 2–3 silencing the torcidas at the Beira-Rio. Inter even had a penalty kick in their favor, which was failed to convert into goal. Since the aggregate was tied at 3–3, a penalty shootout ensued to decide the finalist, and Olimpia won 3–5, eliminating the Colorados. This elimination has been dubbed by fans as "O desastre do Beira-Rio".

The fourth star
In 1992, Internacional won its fourth national title, the Brazilian Cup, against Fluminense. The first leg in Rio de Janeiro was a 2–1 defeat. The return leg before a packed Beira-Rio saw the team coached by Antônio Lopes come back to win 1–0. The club secured the title with the away goals rule.

Copa Libertadores and afterwards

Under the leadership of chairman Fernando Carvalho Inter entered the new millennium seeking renewal from their youth teams. The club won four state titles in a row, from 2002 to 2005. The club modernized all its departments and prepared for a new football era. The South American Cup meant a return to the world stage and prepared the team for contesting the Copa Libertadores title. The campaign included eight wins, six draws, and just one defeat, to Ecuador's LDU Quito in the quarter-finals. To win the title, Internacional had to move past two clubs that had won the tournament three times – Uruguay's Nacional and São Paulo, who were the defending champions.

Against São Paulo, Internacional arguably won the title away in the first leg. Stunning the 80,000 são-paulinos attending the match at the Morumbi stadium, Rafael Sóbis scored twice in the second half before defender Edcarlos scored for São Paulo. Internacional needed just a draw in the second leg at home, and they left the pitch as South American champions for the first time. Striker Fernandão, who, along with Tinga, scored in the final match at the Beira-Rio stadium, was one of the 14 players finishing as top scorer of the Libertadores, with five goals. He was voted Man of the Match against São Paulo and won a Toyota Corolla as the prize. Fernandão put the car up for auction and gave the money to charity organizations.

Internacional competed in the 2006 FIFA Club World Cup and shocked the heavily favored European champions Barcelona with such stars as Ronaldinho and Deco 1–0 in the final for their first ever World Championship. They would also win the 2007 Recopa Sudamericana. Amidst all the victories in 2006, International had a bad start to the 2007 season. But to close this winning cycle with a triumph, Inter won the Recopa Sudamericana as they defeated Mexican club Pachuca with a final score of 5–2. In the first game in Mexico, the team had a good performance but was defeated 2–1. Alexandre Pato opened the scoring. In the second match, supported by over 51,000 fans crammed into Beira-Rio, Inter beat the opponent by a score of 4–0 – the biggest win of the competition's history.

Two-times champion: Inter's success culminates with the greatest prize

After the Recopa triumph, Internacional struggled to refill the ranks left after the triumphant generation of 2006; the club finished in 11th place in the Série A, which was barely enough to allow Internacional to participate in the 2008 Copa Sudamericana. In 2008, Internacional won their state championship and participated in a friendly tournament called Dubai Cup 2008. In the same year, Internacional won the Copa Sudamericana, beating Argentine side Estudiantes de La Plata, becoming the first Brazilian winners of the trophy. Internacional repeated the Copa Sudamericana title; finished in a much-improved 6th place in the national league; retained their state title; reached the finals of the Copa do Brasil (the best finish the club has had since 1999); and won the Suruga Bank tournament. On 2 April 2009, Inter launched its third uniform celebrating its centenary, with a golden shirt, red shorts and red socks. The golden shirt represented the glories won in their history. In August 2009, English club Tottenham Hotspur announced that a partnership was completed between the two clubs. The team performed extremely well on the 2009 Brazilian Championship, finishing as runners-up to Flamengo by 2 points. With this 2nd place, Internacional qualified to participate, once again, in the 2010 Copa Libertadores.

Internacional was the top-seed of Group 5, which also contained Ecuador side Deportivo Quito and Emelec, as well as Cerro from Uruguay. In the 2010 season, Internacional finished first in their group, winning their three home matches and tying their away games, no least thanks to figures such as Kléber, Alecsandro, Giuliano and Argentine midfielder Andrés D'Alessandro. This saw the Colorados face off against Argentine champions Banfield; the series finished in a tight 3–3 scoreline, with Kléber's away goal in Banfield enough to send them through to the quarterfinals. In that stage, Internacional faced reigning champions Estudiantes, in a rematch of the 2008 Copa Sudamericana Finals. Despite dominating most of the first leg played in Porto Alegre, Internacional only managed a 1–0 win. In Argentina, Estudiantes were winning 2–0 until the 88th minute, when Giuliano, Internacional's star goalscorer, put the ball in the net to give Inter a much needed goal and see them through to the semifinals to meet São Paulo, in a rematch of the finals four years earlier. Again, Internacional only managed a 1–0 win at home despite dominating the game, and in São Paulo Alecsandro scored the decisive, away goal that saw Inter go through to their third final ever of the competition. Internacional won their second Copa Libertadores title after they defeated Guadalajara 1–2 in the first leg and 3–2 in the second leg to clinch a 5–3 aggregate win.

This victory gave Internacional the right to compete once again in the 2010 FIFA Club World Cup, with the goal of repeating the 2006 feat and becoming one of the very few Brazilian soccer clubs to have won the Club World Cup twice. However, they were eliminated in the semi-final by Congolese side TP Mazembe, the African champions, in a 0–2 upset that completely stunned Brazilian soccer specialists and fans, and also most international soccer observers.

Relegation and comeback
After a pretty good start in the 2016 Campeonato Brasileiro Série A, Internacional started to struggle and fell off to the bottom of the table, a run which included a 14-game winless streak. That led to the club's first relegation in its history, only ten years after winning the 2006 FIFA Club World Cup over a historical FC Barcelona team. Despite this setback, the club would eventually be promoted after finishing second in 2017 Campeonato Brasileiro Série B.

Crests

First team

Out on loan

Personnel

Technical staff

Health and performance staff

Management and support

Players statistics

 All-time Top Scorers

 All-time most appearances

 Brazilian Championship Top Scorers

 Brazilian Championship most appearances

Honours

International
FIFA Club World Cup: 2006
Copa Libertadores: 2006, 2010
Copa Sudamericana: 2008
Recopa Sudamericana: 2007, 2011
Suruga Bank Championship: 2009

National
Brasileiro Série A: 1975, 1976, 1979
Copa do Brasil: 1992
Torneio Heleno Nunes: 1984

Regional
Campeonato Gaúcho: (45) 1927, 1934, 1940, 1941, 1942, 1943, 1944, 1945, 1947, 1948, 1950, 1951, 1952, 1953, 1955, 1961, 1969, 1970, 1971, 1972, 1973, 1974, 1975, 1976, 1978, 1981, 1982, 1983, 1984, 1991, 1992, 1994, 1997, 2002, 2003, 2004, 2005, 2008, 2009, 2011, 2012, 2013, 2014, 2015, 2016

Other
Copa FGF: 2009, 2010
 Copa Governador do Estado: 1978, 1991
Recopa Gaúcha: 2016, 2017
Super Copa Gaúcha: 2016
Copa Sul-Fronteira: 2016

Friendly
 (CHI) Torneio Viña del Mar: 1978, 2001
 (ESP) Joan Gamper Trophy: 1982
 (ESP) Torneio Costa do Sol: 1983
 (CAN) Torneio Costa do Pacífico: 1983
 (JPN) Kirin Cup: 1984
 (SCO) Rangers International Tournament: 1987
 (ESP)  Tournament Vigo City: 1987
 (JPN) Wako Denki Cup: 1992
 (UAE) Dubai Cup: 2008
 (JPN)  Sumitomo Bank Cup: 1994 
 Vice Champions Silver Medal Football 1984 Summer Olympics represented The Brazil national football team in 1984 Olympic Football Tournament: 1984

See also
Sport Club Internacional (women), women's team

References

External links

 Official Website

 
Football clubs in Brazil
Football clubs in Rio Grande do Sul
Football clubs in Porto Alegre
Association football clubs established in 1909
Inter
Inter
Inter
Inter
Copa do Brasil winning clubs
Campeonato Brasileiro Série A winning clubs